Sonta Ooru is a 1956 Indian Telugu-language drama film, produced by G. Sadasivudu under the G.V.S. Productions banner and directed by E. S. N. Murthy. It stars N. T. Rama Rao, Sowcar Janaki and  music composed by Ghantasala.

Plot
The film begins in a village, where Rayanam a farmer who lost his entire wealth in charities, he has three children, Madhav & Chinnabai, and a daughter Aruna. Madhav returns to his village after completing his education and decides to take up farming, so, he takes his blind friend Dasu's land on lease. Lakshmi is a milkwoman, adores Rayanam & Madhav as deities. Parallelly, Chinnabai quarrels with his father and starts a hotel by taking a loan from a widow Pitchamma. Pitchamma aspires to couple up her daughter Damayanti with Madhav despite he leaves agriculture and moves to the city. At the same time, a doctor Damodaram Tripada/DDT lands at the village and falls for Damayanti. Meanwhile, Lakshmi loves Madhav but maintains silence due to fear, even helping them in their needs unknowingly. Learning it, Munsif of the village Dayanidhi questions Madhav when he becomes furious and questions Lakshmi, but later, through Dasu he realizes Lakshmi's love. On the other side, Rayanam fixes Aruna's alliance and obtains some amount of debt which is stolen by Chinnabai. Here Dasu's mother Chukamma exploits the situation and asks Rayanam to perform Aruna's espousal with Dasu, to which he refuses. Keeping the grudge in mind, Chukamma colludes with Pitchamma and both of them spread rumors against Madhav, Lakshmi & Aruna. On the occasion of Deepavali, while Madhav is returning to the village, the men sent by Pitchamma attack him. Eventually, DDT & Dayanidhi hits Lakshmi and Aruna tries to commit suicide. The rest of the story is about how all of them escape from these hazardous situations.

Cast
N. T. Rama Rao as Madhav
Sowcar Janaki as Lakshmi
C.S.R. as Rayanam
Ramana Reddy 
Amarnath as Chinnabai
Vangara
Chadalavada
Rajasulochana as Aruna
Suryakantham
Hemalatha
Surabhi Kamalabai
Chandra Kumari

Soundtrack

Music composed by Ghantasala.

References

Indian drama films
Films scored by Ghantasala (musician)
1956 drama films
1956 films
Indian black-and-white films